The Moscow Loan is the name of a loan of US$1.2 million by Communist Party of the Soviet Union to Polish United Workers' Party in January 1990.  The PUWP coordinators were Mieczysław Rakowski and Leszek Miller.  $300,000 was spent to set up Trybuna, a left-wing newspaper, $200,000 on severance pay for employees of PUWP, $500,000 given back to the Russians, and $200,000 circulated to pay off the loan in installments.  It has caused controversy in Polish politics and occasioned year-long prosecution. In the end nobody was sentenced.

References

Controversies in Poland
1990 in Poland
1990 in the Soviet Union
Poland–Soviet Union relations
Loans